Honeysuckle Rose may refer to:
"Honeysuckle Rose" (song), a 1928 jazz standard by Fats Waller and Andy Razaf
Honeysuckle Rose (film), a 1980 American musical drama starring Willie Nelson, Amy Irving, and Dyan Cannon
Honeysuckle Rose (album), the soundtrack to the 1980 movie